Polyfuran (PFu) is a polymer that consists of multiple furanylene rings.  Such materials are of interest for their potential in molecular electronics, although much less studied than polythiophenes and polypyrroles. Polyfuran is distinct from furan resins, a class of non-conjugated polymers.  Furan resins are of commercial interest, in contrast to polyfuran.

Polyfurans can be prepared by electrochemical approaches.  The mechanism of polymerization is proposed to involve radical cation intermediates, i.e. species with the formula C4R4O+.

Polyfurans can also be produced using acid catalysts. Radical polymerization has also been explored, and oxidative cationic polymerization.

References 

Organic polymers
Furans